The Iranian society in the Sasanian era was an Agrarian society and due to this fact, the Sasanian economy relied on farming and agriculture.

The main exports of the Sasanians were silk; woolen and golden textiles; carpets and rugs; hides; and leather and pearls from the Persian Gulf. There were also goods in transit from China (paper, silk) and India (spices), which Sasanian customs imposed taxes upon, and which were re-exported from the Empire to Europe.

Due to special geographical situation of the Iranian world, the Sasanians were able to control the sea routes and due to this, they were arguably most important player in the international trade in the late antiquity.

Local trade 
We know that in the early Sasanian period, the empire showed a great interest in establishing ports on the coast of the Persian Gulf. In the Karnamag of Ardashir Papagan (Book of Deeds of Ardashir son of Papak), one of these ports is mentioned, and it is called "Bōxt-Artaxšīr", which is modern-day Bushehr. This port was important for the Sasanians because it linked Kazerun to center of Persis, modern-day Shiraz. There were other ports on the Iranian side of the Persian Gulf in the Sassanid period, like Sirāf, Hormuz, Kujaran Artaxšīr, etc. According to Ammianus Marcellinus “all along the coast [of the Persian Gulf] is a throng of cities and villages, and many ships sail to and from.”

International trade

Rivalry with the Roman Empire 
We know that in the sixth century, the Sasanians were not only bent on controlling the Arabian sea and of course, their own home waters, the Persian Gulf, but also looked further east. This brought the Persians into conflict with Rome. Silk was important in the ancient world and was something that the Romans wanted. With the seas under Iranian control, the Romans had to seek the aid of the Ethiopians. However, this plan failed and probably caused the Aksumite–Persian wars, which made Yemen an Iranian vassal at the end of the wars.

Procopius states that Justinian sent and embassy to Axum, and requested the Ethiopians "that they should buy silk from the Indians, and sell it to the Romans. thus they would make a lot of money, while they would only be bringing this gain to the Romans, that they [the Romans] would no longer be forced to send their own money to their enemies [the Persians.]" However, the plan didn't succeed, "for it was impossible for the Ethiopians to buy silk from the Indians, because the Persian merchants present at the very ports [of Ceylon in Sri Lanka] where the first ships of the Indians put in, since they inhabit a neighboring country, were always accustomed to buy the entire cargoes." However, it is not believed that being neighbors was the reason behind cooperation of Iranian and Sinhalese merchants, and the better reason would be that the Iranians were long-established customers and they didn't want to offend the Sasanians by doing business with the rivals of the Persian Empire. However, silk problem of the Romans was solved by the introduction of silkworms to the Roman Empire.

Trade with China 
We also have information about the Sasanian trade with China. Iranian-Chinese trade was conducted through two ways, through the Silk Road and the sea routes. Many Sasanian coins were found on the coasts of China.

Bazaars 
The main economic activity in the cities was performed by the merchants (Middle Persian: wāzarganan) and took place in the bazaars. In the Sasanian-era bazaars, each group of artisans had its own specific section, called rāste in Persian. We know this information from the Denkard, which talks about the rules that existed "about the series of shops in the bazaar belonging to various artisans." (VIII, Chapter 38) The Denkard also mentions a list of professions who occupied a section of the bazaar, like the blacksmiths (Middle Persian: āhengar) and barbers (Middle Persian: wars-wirāy).

For each artisan guild (kirrog), there was a head of the guild (kirrogbed) and the activity and the prices of the bazaar were overlooked by a head of the bazaar, known as wāzārbed in Middle Persian. This office (wāzārbed) is also mentioned in the Res Gestae Divi Saporis.

Merchants 
While there were Sasanian merchants as far as China, the Zoroastrian view on them is not very good. The Mēnōg of Khrad (Spirit of Wisdom), one of the most important Zoroastrian books, talks about the merchants very negatively.

Iranian colonies in South and East Asia 
We also know about establishments of Sasanian colony and ports as far as East Asia. There were a Sasanian colony in Malaysia which was composed of merchants. Since Persian horses were shipped to Ceylon, a Sasanian colony was established at that island, where the ships came from Iran to its port. To expand their trade, the Sasanians built more ports, in the places like Muscat and Sohar. We even know about Sasanian colonies at Kilwa on the east coast of Africa. 

Establishment of Iranian colonies in China has also been confirmed, by the existence of Zoroastrian fire-temples, found in the Chang’an region in southern China.

See also 

 Sasanian coinage
 Economy of Iran
 Roman economy
 Byzantine economy

References

Further reading 
 

Economy of Iran
Sasanian Empire